Chieri  is a  town and comune in Piedmont, Italy.

Chieri may also refer to:
 Chieri Calcio, an Italian association football club, based in Chieri
 Chieri '76 Volleyball, an Italian women's volleyball club based in Chieri
 Chieri, a fictional Darkover race
 Chieri Sono, a fictional character of AKB0048

See also 

 Ceri (disambiguation)
 Cheri (disambiguation)
 Chiari (disambiguation)